Volleyball in Canada dates back to the beginning of the 20th century. Today, the sport is played at various levels of competition throughout the country.

History
Volleyball was invented in the United States in 1895 and made its first appearance in Canada in 1900 when an Ottawa branch of the YMCA included it in its schedule. The sport caught on and soon spread to YMCAs in Toronto and Montreal. These centers conducted various tournaments, which were, for a long time, the only organized manifestations of the sport in Canada. While the sport spread throughout the United States, Russia and Asia before the First World War, it lay relatively dormant in Canada. With the creation of the Federation Internationale de Volleyball (FIVB) shortly after the Second World War, the sport gained international recognition.

Canada joined the FIVB in 1953, the same year the Canadian Volleyball Association was founded. Gordon Odell
served as interim president before Wes McVicar took over as the association's first president. The current president, Dave Carey, oversees an organization of over 80,000 members. Renamed Volleyball Canada (VC), the association has its headquarters in Ottawa. When founded, VC was divided into three regions: Ottawa, Toronto and Montreal. Today, the regions are drawn along provincial/territorial lines and take in the whole of Canada.

Canada's first international experience in the sport took place in 1959 at the Pan-American Games in Chicago. Today, the Canadian teams strive to qualify for all of the international tournaments for which they are eligible. Since 1976, both the Men's and Women's indoor National Teams have participated in the Olympic Games and the World Championships on several occasions. The best result for both the Men's and Women's teams was achieved at the 1984 Olympic Games in Los Angeles where they finished 4th and 8th respectively. In 1998, Volleyball Canada became the umbrella organization for the national disabled volleyball program, a program that has had continued success since this partnership. The National Men's Standing Disabled Volleyball Team brought home Volleyball Canada's first gold medal at the 2002 World Championships in Poland, and went on to defend its title in 2004.

Major volleyball events 
1895 - William G. Morgan invented volleyball
1947 - The FIVB (Fédération International de Volley-Ball) is founded
1949 - Prague, First Men's World Championship
1952 - Moscow, First Women's World Championship
1953 - First Canadian Championship
1959 - Canadian Men's National Volleyball Team first participates in International Competition (Pan Am Games)
1964 - Tokyo, First Olympic titles are awarded to Japan (Women's) and USSR (Men's)
1968 - Canada and USA join the Central American and Caribbean Zone, which thereafter becomes known as NORCECA
1972 - First international medal won by the Canadian Men's Team by placing third at the NORCECA Championship in Mexico
1976 - Canada hosts Montreal Olympic Games
1977 - First Junior Men's and Women's World Championships
1977 - Canada's Men's Team wins bronze medal at the Pan Am Games – first major game medal
1980 - 1st Gold Medal won by Canada internationally - NORCECA Junior's - Women (Calgary, Canada)
1983 - Canada hosts Universiade Games in Edmonton. Canadian men qualify for 1984 Olympics by defeating Cuba
1984 - Canadian men finish fourth at Los Angeles Olympic Games
1990 - FIVB introduces the World League
1991 - Canadian Men participate for the first time in the World League
1991 - Canada hosts NORCECA Championships in Regina and Team Canada Men qualifies for 1992 Olympics
1996 - Canada hosts NORCECA Olympic qualifiers for Men and Women
1996 - Team Canada Women participate in Atlanta Olympics
1996 - Beach Volleyball debuts as a full medal sport in Atlanta Olympic Games
1996 - Canadians John Child and Mark Heese win bronze medal for beach volleyball in Atlanta Olympics
1998 - Canadian Men's Junior National Team wins at NORCECA to qualify for Junior World Championships
1999 - Canada returns to Men's World League and plays in it for the 1999 and 2000 seasons
1999 - Canada hosts Women's World Junior Championships in Saskatoon/Edmonton
1999 - Canada wins the bronze medal for Men's Indoor and the gold medal for Men's Beach (Conrad Leinemann/Jody Holden) at the *1999 Pan Am Games in Winnipeg
1999 - New Rules of the game
2000 - Canada's Men's Standing Disabled team wins silver medal at the 2000 Sydney Paralympic Games
2002 - Canada's Men's and Women's Indoor National Teams qualify for World Championships
2002 - Canada's Men's Standing Disabled team wins gold medal at the 2002 World Disabled Volleyball Championships World Organization Volleyball for Disabled

See also

 Canada men's national volleyball team
 Canada women's national volleyball team
 Canada men's junior national volleyball team

References

External links 
Volleyball Canada